The China women's national field hockey team represents the People's Republic of China. The team won silver at the 2008 Summer Olympics in Beijing, as well as bronze at the 2002 Hockey World Cup in Perth, Australia.  Also, the team won the 2002 Hockey Champions Trophy and finished second in 2004 and 2006.

Tournament history

Summer Olympics
2000 – 5th place
2004 – 4th place
2008 – 
2012 – 6th place
2016 – 9th place
2020 – 9th place

World Cup

World League
2012–13 – 6th place
2014–15 – 4th place
2016–17 – 8th place

Pro League
2019 – 7th place
2020–21 – 8th place
2021–22 – 8th place
2022–23 – Qualified

Champions Trophy
2001 – 4th place
2002 – 
2003 – 
2004 – 5th place
2005 – 
2006 – 
2008 – 4th place
2010 – 6th place
2011 – 7th place
2012 – 8th place
2014 – 6th place
2018 – 4th place

Champions Challenge
2007 –

Asian Games
1990 – 
1994 – 
1998 – 
2002 – 
2006 – 
2010 – 
2014 – 
2018 – 
2022 – Qualified

Asia Cup
1989 – 
1993 – 
1999 – 
2004 – 
2007 – 
2009 – 
2013 – 4th place
2017 – 
2022 – 4th place

Asian Champions Trophy
2010 – 4th place
2011 – 
2013 – 4th place
2016 – 
2018 – 
2021 –

Current squad
The squad for the 2022 Women's FIH Hockey World Cup.

Head coach: Alyson Annan

See also
China men's national field hockey team

References

External links

FIH profile

Asian women's national field hockey teams
Field hockey
National